Witchtrap (also known as The Presence) is a 1989 American supernatural horror film written and directed by Kevin S. Tenney and starring James W. Quinn, Kathleen Bailey, and Linnea Quigley. The film follows a team of parapsychologists who attempt to exorcise a haunted inn with the help of a device designed to lure in and trap evil spirits. Despite the film's title, its central villain is a warlock. Witchtrap was released direct-to-video.

Cast
 James W. Quinn as Tony Vincente
 Kathleen Bailey as Whitney O'Shay
 Judy Tatum as Agnes Goldberg
 Rob Zapple as Felix Goldberg
 Jack W. Thompson as Murphy
 Clyde Talley II as Levi Jackson
 Hal Havins as Elwin
 Linnea Quigley as Ginger Kowowski
 Kevin S. Tenney as Devon Lauder
 J. P. Luebsen as Avery Lauter
 Richard Fraga as Amazing Azimov
 Lynn McRee as Q.T. Secretary

Critical reception
A contemporary review in Variety criticized the film's ending as "cryptic", and noted that the "makeup effects by Judy Yonemoto are okay". In his book Creature Features: The Science Fiction, Fantasy, and Horror Movie Guide, John Stanley wrote that "due to flat, nonatmospheric lighting, mediocre actresses and inadequate effects, Witchtrap limps along without much conviction." Brian Orndorf of Blu-ray.com called the film "an engaging feature" that "builds to a satisfying grand finale, only making a few missteps in tone and technical achievements", though he noted that "the screenplay's interest in spiritual debates is perhaps better left to a more sophisticated picture".

Home media
In March 2017, the film was restored in 2K and released on DVD and Blu-ray by Vinegar Syndrome.

References

External links
 
 

1989 horror films
1989 films
American supernatural horror films
American ghost films
Films about witchcraft
1980s supernatural horror films
1980s English-language films
1980s American films